Židovar is an archeological site and settlement near Vršac, Serbia.

History
The earliest archeological findings date from the early Bronze Age and are followed by middle Bronze Age relics of the Vatin culture and late Bronze Age remains of the Belegiš culture. The subsequent findings belonging to the early and middle Iron Age Bosut-Basarabi culture date back to the 9th to 8th century BC. Finds of the La Tène era dating from the 2nd century BC until the 1st century AD, mostly pottery, accessories (jewelry, fibulae) and weapons, are mostly the work of the Scordisci. Their more numerous presence after the Celtic invasions in 279 BC, with a significant 10% belonging to the earlier Getae-Dacian cultures, is a result of co-existence and trading between the two peoples. The remains of the Scordisci fortifications with ditch and defense wall impart special importance to the site.

In 1990, Židovar was added to the list of Archaeological Sites of Exceptional Importance under the protection of the Republic of Serbia.

See also
 Archaeological Sites of Exceptional Importance

References

Archaeological sites in Serbia
Archaeological Sites of Exceptional Importance
Oppida